Chen Tianwen (born 28 March 1963) is a Singaporean actor.

Career 
Chen was educated at the now-defunct Serangoon Garden Secondary Technical School. He joined the Singapore Broadcasting Corporation (now Mediacorp) after completing the 5th artiste drama training class and made his debut in 1984. He is contracted to Mediacorp, starring in many Chinese-language Singaporean dramas shown on MediaCorp Channel 8 since the 1990s. He has also starred in Singaporean movies including Ah Boys to Men 2, Ah Boys to Men 3: Frogmen and The Lion Men: Ultimate Showdown.

Chen holds a black belt in taekwondo and his martial arts background led to him being cast in many Wuxia dramas in the 1990s and as characters with fight scenes in other drama series. He is also a member of the Singapore Celebrity Soccer Team.

The Straits Times remarked that Chen's "much-praised understated turn" in the Cannes Film Festival award-winning film Ilo Ilo put him in the spotlight once again.

Chen hit the headlines again when two parody music videos he starred in, went viral. The first, titled "Unbelievable", was "lauded" for the nonsensical line "I so stunned like vegetable" , drawing the attention of Time magazine, while the second, "Sandcastle in My Heart", in which Irene Ang also starred, did not become as popular as the previous one. Both videos are a parody of popular Chinese MVs in the 1970s, particularly the work of Singaporean singer Huang Chingyuan.

Personal life 
Chen told Channel NewsAsia that he and Bao Xiao Hui, a Mongolian, were married in May 2014. The couple had a son, Genghis, on 12 June 2015.

Filmography

Films

Television

Compilation album

Awards and nominations

References

External links 
Profile on xinmsn

Living people
Singaporean male television actors
Singaporean people of Chinese descent
1963 births